Baleswar may refer to:

 Balasore, a city in the state of Odisha, India
 Balasore district, an administrative district of Odisha, India
 Baleshwar Temple, an ancient temple dedicated to Shiva in Champawat, Uttarakhand, India
 Baleshwar River, a river in Bangladesh
 Baleswari Odia, a dialect of Odia spoken in Balasore, Bhadrak and Mayurbhanj districts of Odisha, India

See also
 Balesar (disambiguation)